PCMA may refer to:

 Pharmaceutical Care Management Association
 Pomona College Museum of Art, the former name of the Benton Museum of Art at Pomona College
 Professional Convention Management Association
 Pulse Code Modulation A-Law, part of the G.711 audio codec
 NSW Premier's Multicultural Communication Awards

See also
 Personal Computer Memory Card International Association  (PCMCIA)